Gaetano Alimonda (23 October 1818 – 30 May 1891) was an Italian prelate of the Catholic Church, who was Archbishop of Turin from 1883 until his death. He was previously Bishop of Albenga from 1877 to 1879. He was made a cardinal in 1879.

Biography
Gaetano Alimonda was born in Genoa on 23 October 1818. He studied at the University of Genoa. He earned a doctorate in theology. He was ordained a priest on 10 June 1843.

He taught at that seminary and became vice-superior and, in 1854, rector. His superiors supported his opposition to intransigent proponents of papal rights and he wrote for publications that supported compromise and accommodation with Italian unification. He was committed to an increased role for the laity and therefore worked to develop Catholic publishing and undertook an extensive program of preaching, modeled on the work of Lacordaire in France, in defense of Christian civilization against rationalism.

Pope Pius IX appointed him bishop of Albenga on 21 September 1877. He received his episcopal consecration on 11 November 1877 from Salvatore Magnasco, archbishop of Genoa. In that post he continued to advocate for reconciliation with Vittorio Emanuele II and the House of Savoy.

He resigned as bishop when Pope Leo XIII made him a cardinal priest on 12 May 1879, one of the first group of cardinals Leo created.
He received his red galero as well as the title of Santa Maria in Traspontina in the consistory of 22 September 1879.

Pope Leo appointed him archbishop of Turin on 9 August 1883.

In 1887, at Pope Leo's suggestion, he wrote a tract advocating rapprochement: I voti degli italiani per la pace religiosa.

He died in a convent in the Albaro neighborhood of Genoa of liver disease on 30 May 1891.

References

External links
 
 

1818 births
1891 deaths
People from Genoa
Cardinals created by Pope Leo XIII
19th-century Italian cardinals
Deaths from liver disease